Carmen L. Robertson is a writer and scholar of art history and indigenous peoples. She was born in Balcarres, Saskatchewan, of Lakota and Scottish ancestry. She is Canada Research Chair in North American Art and Material Culture in the Faculty of Arts and Social Sciences at Carleton University. Before joining Carleton, Robertson was an associate professor in the Faculty of Media, Art & Performance at the University of Regina (2006-2012). She also served as the Indian Fine Arts department head at the First Nations University of Canada where she taught from 2000-2006.  A number of Robertson's writings focus on the Aboriginal Canadian artist Norval Morrisseau. She is past president of the Native Heritage Foundation of Canada.

Education 
Robertson received her BA in Liberal Arts at Portland State University in 1989, her MA in Art History at University of Victoria in 1993, her MEd in Aboriginal Adult Education at Brock University in 2001, and her PhD in Educational Research at the University of Calgary in 2005. Robertson works to promote the awareness of Aboriginal artists.

Career
Robertson's best-known book is Seeing Red: A History of Natives in Canadian Newspapers, co-written with Mark Cronlund Anderson. Seeing Red is a study about how Canadian English-language newspapers portray Aboriginal people. Seeing Red received the Saskatchewan Book Award for Scholarly Writing (2011), First Peoples' Writing (2011), and Regina Book of The Year (2011).

Robertson co-edited Clearing a Path: New Ways of Seeing Traditional Indigenous Art with Sherry Farrell Racette. This book was published by Regina: Canadian Plains Research Centre in 2009 and it looks at notable Saskatchewan Metis artists.

A number of Robertson's writings focus on the Aboriginal Canadian artist Norval Morrisseau, including Norval Marisseau: A Complex but Critical Legacy. In 2019, she notably testified in the Court of Appeal for Ontario on the in-authenticity of a Morrisseau painting purchased at Maslak-McLeod Gallery by collector Kevin Hearn. This case is featured in the documentary There are no Fakes, produced by TV Ontario, in 2020.

Robertson has curated a number of exhibitions in Canada, including Dana Claxton: The Sioux Project—Tatanka Oyate at the MacKenzie Art Gallery, in Regina, Saskatchewan September-January 2017-2018.

Robertson is a past president of the Native Heritage Foundation of Canada, where she advocated accessibility and preservation for collections of aboriginal Canadian art.  She also serves on the editorial board of the Australian Journal of Indigenous Education, published by Cambridge University Press.

Selected bibliography

Books

Articles 
"Land and Beaded Identity: Shaping Art Histories of Indigenous Women of the Flatland". Revue d'art canadienne/Canadian Art Review, Vol. 432, No. 2 : 13-29. 2017.

References

External links
Carmen Robertson, Faculty of Media, Art, and Performance, University of Regina.

1962 births
Living people
Brock University alumni
Linguists from Canada
Women linguists
People from Fort Qu'Appelle
Portland State University alumni
University of Calgary alumni
Academic staff of the University of Regina
University of Victoria alumni